Eaton Socon Football Club is a football club based in St Neots, England. They are currently members of the Spartan South Midlands League Division One and play at River Road, St Neots.

History
Eaton Socon were formed in 1867. In 2005, the club joined the Cambridgeshire County League Premier Division, after winning the Senior Division A. In 2022, the club was admitted into the Spartan South Midlands League Division One.

Ground
The club currently play at River Road, St Neots.

References

St Neots
Association football clubs established in 1867
1867 establishments in England
Football clubs in England
Football clubs in Cambridgeshire
Cambridgeshire County Football League
Spartan South Midlands Football League